The Lame Devil (from ) may refer to:

As a work
 , one translation of the 1707 novel by Alain-René Lesage
 The Lame Devil (film), one translation of the 1948 film by Sacha Guitry
 El Diablo cojuelo (tr. "The Lame Devil"), a 1641 satire by Luis Vélez de Guevara
 Der krumme Teufel (tr. "The Lame Devil"), the 1751 debut opera by Haydn
 "Lame Devil", one of Italo Calvino's 1956 Italian Folktales

As a historical nickname
 Asmodeus, a demon king
 Talleyrand (1754–1838), French diplomat
 Eliaser Bamberg (1760-1833), Dutch stage magician
 Lord Byron (1788–1824), English poet

See also
 Le Diable boiteux (disambiguation), items under the original French title